The St. Louis Gateway Film Critics Association Award for Best Actress is one of the annual awards given by the St. Louis Gateway Film Critics Association.

Winners

2000s

2010s

2020s

Notes

Actress
Film awards for lead actress